The Queen Adelaide Club is an exclusive women's club, similar to a gentlemen's club, in the South Australian capital city of Adelaide. It is named for Adelaide of Saxe-Meiningen, after whom the city of Adelaide was named. Founded in 1909, the club was set up by women of the Adelaide Establishment "who wanted a social centre with a certain standard of living and were prepared to pay for it".

The club is located at the corner of North Terrace and Stephens Place in the city-centre, a short distance east along North Terrace from its previously all-male equivalent, the Adelaide Club, established in 1864.

Unlike the purpose-built Adelaide Club building, the Queen Adelaide Club occupies late 19th and early 20th Century buildings which had originally been residences and doctors' consulting rooms.

When first established, the club offered residential accommodation, but no longer does so as the Adelaide Club now offers mixed accommodation.

The Queen Adelaide Club is affiliated with similar establishments within Australia and internationally where members can enjoy reciprocal rights.

Proposed expansion
In June 2014 Adelaide's Sunday Mail reported that the club has gained approval to knock down two of its three heritage-listed buildings, and build a 21-storey building. The first six (above ground) levels are planned to contain expanded club facilities, and the upper 14 levels are planned to contain pairs of 3-bedroom apartments. The third heritage-listed building, at the corner of Stephens Place and North Terrace, is to be retained as the main entrance to the ground floor of the tower, with an adjacent "high end retail tenancy".

References

Susan Magarey (2009) Looking Backward: Looking Forward. A History of the Queen Adelaide Club 1909-2009. Queen Adelaide Club, Adelaide, 2009.

External links
The Queen Adelaide Club - Official Page Accessed 30 January 2013.

1909 establishments in Australia
Organizations established in 1909
Organisations based in Adelaide
Clubs and societies in South Australia
Women's clubs in Australia
Adelaide Establishment
Adelaide of Saxe-Meiningen